Julia Ann Louise Munro (née Campbell; June 30, 1942 – June 12, 2019) was a Canadian politician based in Ontario, Canada. She was a Progressive Conservative member of the Legislative Assembly of Ontario from 1995 until 2018. She represented the riding of York—Simcoe.

Background
Julia Ann Louise Campbell was born in Hamilton, Ontario and raised in Toronto, receiving a Bachelor of Arts degree from the University of Toronto. She taught history in secondary school in Markham and Newmarket for 24 years. She served as a department head in one of the high schools of the York Region Board of Education. She and her husband lived on a farm near Sutton where they bred poodles, borzois and pointers.

From 1992 to 1994, she was the president of the Durham—York Progressive Conservative Association.

Politics
Munro was elected to the Ontario legislature in the 1995 provincial election, defeating incumbent New Democrat Larry O'Connor in the former Durham—York riding. She was re-elected in the redistributed riding of York North in the 1999 election. The Tories lost the 2003 general election, but Munro was able to retain her seat by a reduced margin. She was re-elected in 2007, 2011 and again in 2014, albeit by her narrowest margin, in the riding of York-Simcoe.

Munro was parliamentary assistant to the premier from 1995 to 1998 in charge of promoting volunteerism and government whip from 1999 to 2001.

In 2002, Munro introduced a private member's bill to clamp down on puppy mills. Earlier, the government defeated a similar bill introduced by Liberal Mike Colle that would have licensed dog breeders and given SPCA officials the right to inspect breeding operations. Munro's bill introduced standards of care for dog breeding operations but did not call for licences or inspection rights. Critics alleged that Munro was in a conflict of interest when she introduced weaker legislation since she was a dog breeder herself. Colle said, "you don't need a licence to be a breeder, you don't get inspected. Anyone can claim to be a breeder and you don't need any qualifications." The bill was eventually passed.

She was the party's critic for the new Ontario Pension Plan, and in 2014 she was Deputy Opposition House Leader.

In January 2017, she became the longest-serving female MPP in Ontario's history.

On March 21, 2017, Munro announced she would not run for her seat again in the 2018 Ontario provincial election after 22 years in the Legislature.

Personal life

Munro was married to John and lived in Georgina with their daughter. She taught Barenaked Ladies drummer Tyler Stewart at Huron Heights Secondary School. She died on June 12, 2019, at the age of 76.

Election record

References

External links 

1942 births
Canadian people of Scottish descent
2019 deaths
People from the Regional Municipality of York
Politicians from Hamilton, Ontario
Progressive Conservative Party of Ontario MPPs
University of Toronto alumni
Women MPPs in Ontario
21st-century Canadian politicians
21st-century Canadian women politicians